Sadurn is an American indie rock band from Philadelphia, Pennsylvania.

History
The band started as a solo project of Genevieve DeGroot in 2017 shortly after they had begun learning guitar and writing songs. Jon Cox joined the project later that year on accompanying guitar, and the two began circling the Philadelphia DIY scene as an acoustic duo. In 2019 Sadurn released two EPs through local label Dead Definition, one entitled “Gleam” and the other a split with the band Ther. In 2020, the duo expanded, with DeGroot's friend Amelia Swain joining as drummer as well as Tabitha Ahnert as bassist. In February 2022, the group announced their debut album titled Radiator, to be released through Run for Cover Records. The album was released on May 6, 2022. The band has been dubbed "The Best of What's Next" by Paste.

Discography
Studio albums
Radiator (2022, Run for Cover Records)
EPs
Friends with your Friends (2017)
Gleam (2019)
Splits
Sadurn/Ther (2019)

References

Musical groups established in 2015